Sonya Di Rienzo is a Canadian film producer. She is most noted as a producer of the films My Tree, which was a Canadian Screen Award nominee for Best Feature Length Documentary at the 10th Canadian Screen Awards in 2022, and Brother, which was a CSA nominee for Best Motion Picture at the 11th Canadian Screen Awards in 2023.

She is a partner with Aeschylus Poulos in Hawkeye Pictures.

References

External links

Canadian women film producers
Film producers from Ontario
Living people